Big Sur is a 2013 adventure drama film written and directed by Michael Polish. It is an adaptation of the 1962 novel of the same name by Jack Kerouac.

The story is based on the time Kerouac spent in Big Sur, California, and his three brief sojourns to his friend Lawrence Ferlinghetti's cabin in Bixby Canyon. These trips were taken by Kerouac in an attempt to recuperate from his mental and physical deterioration due to his alcoholism and the pressures of his sudden success.

The film debuted on January 23, 2013, at the 2013 Sundance Film Festival, where it received generally positive reviews. The film received a limited theatrical release in the United States on November 1, 2013.

Plot
Jack Kerouac, coming off the recent success of On the Road, is unable to cope with a suddenly demanding public and his rise in popularity, and begins battling with advanced alcoholism as a result. He seeks respite first in solitude in the Big Sur cabin, then in a relationship with Billie, the mistress of his long-time friend Neal Cassady. Kerouac finds respite in the Big Sur wilderness, but is driven by loneliness to return to the city, and resumes drinking heavily.

Across Kerouac's subsequent trips to Big Sur and interleaved lifestyle in San Francisco, he drunkenly embarrasses Cassady by introducing Billie to Cassady's wife Carolyn, cannot emotionally provide for the increasingly demanding Billie, and finds himself increasingly unable to integrate into suburban life. Kerouac's inner turmoil culminates in his nervous breakdown during his third journey to Big Sur.

Cast
Unlike the novel, which uses pseudonyms for every major character, the film uses their real names (with the exception of Billie, whose real name is Jackie Gibson Mercer). Also, a few major characters from the novel, such as Allen Ginsberg, Robert LaVigne, Albert Saijo, and Gary Snyder, were cut from the film.

 Jean-Marc Barr as Jack Kerouac
 Josh Lucas as Neal Cassady
 Radha Mitchell as Carolyn Cassady
 Anthony Edwards as Lawrence Ferlinghetti
 Stana Katic as Lenore Kandel
 Balthazar Getty as Michael McClure
 Kate Bosworth as Willamine "Billie" Dabney
 Henry Thomas as Philip Whalen
 Patrick Fischler as Lew Welch
 Jason W. Wong as Victor Wong
 Ryan Teeple as Elliot Dabney
 Jasper Polish as Vulture Girl

Production
Much of the filming was in Monterey County, California, including Big Sur, where the events of the novel take place.

Music was composed by Aaron and Bryce Dessner of The National.

The film was in post-production as of February 2012. A teaser trailer was released on Vimeo on September 23.

Reception
On Rotten Tomatoes, the film has a score of 44%, based on 25 reviews.

References

External links

 

Jack Kerouac
Films about the Beat Generation
American biographical films
American independent films
Films set in California
Films based on American novels
2013 films
Films shot in California
Films directed by Michael Polish
Biographical films about writers
2010s English-language films
2010s American films